MCM  may refer to:

Measurements
 Thousand circular mils or kcmil, the wire gauge is equivalent cross sectional area (500 MCM = 500,000 circular mils)
 Million cubic metre, the unit of volume

Music
 Magic Circle Music, a heavy metal record label
 Magic City Misfits, a roller derby team from Jacksonville, FL
 Maverick City Music, a contemporary christian group
 MCM (TV channel), a French music channel
 Music City Mystique, a Percussion Independent World (PIW) Drumline
 The Mad Capsule Markets, a Japanese punk-metal band
 MCM – The Gospel: The Missing Gems of MCM Caveman (1994-2011) (Mark Layman), rapper and former frontman for UK hip-hop group Caveman
 MCM Records, a French record label established by Jacques and Marcelle Morgantini

Science
 Medical countermeasure (MCM), products that can protect from the effects of a chemical, biological, or nuclear attack
 Minichromosome maintenance protein, which forms DNA helicase in eukaryotic species
 Mobil Composition of Matter or Mobil Crystalline Material, a family of porous silicate-based materials
 Macrocephaly-capillary malformation (M-CM), a rare genetic syndrome
 Methylmalonyl-coenzyme A mutase, an enzyme

Military 
 MCM pistol, a 25-meter Standard Pistol
 Mine Counter-measures, defensive techniques against military mines
 Manual for Courts-Martial, the official guide to the conduct of courts-martial in the United States
 Marine Corps Marathon, a 26-mile marathon held in Arlington, VA and Washington, DC

Technology
 Micro Computer Machines, an early manufacturer of microcomputers, such as the MCM/70
 Microsoft Certified Master
 Mobile content management, software capable of storing and delivering content to mobile devices
 Multi Carrier Modulation
 Multi-chip module, a specialized electronic package

Transportation
 Monaco Heliport's IATA code
 PABCO Transit, Inc or Morris County Metro, a bus system formerly serving Morris County, New Jersey

Other 
 Maranatha Campus Ministries, a former Christian ministry in the U.S.
 Mathematical Contest in Modeling, challenges teams of students to clarify, analyze, and propose solutions to open-ended problems
 M-C-M', Money-Commodity-Money, one of the forms of commodity trade in the theory of Karl Marx
 MCM London Comic Con, a multi-genre fan convention held in London
MCM Worldwide,  leather luxury goods brand
 Melbourne City Mission, a charity in Australia
 Mid-Century modern, an architectural, interior and product design form
 Mighty Car Mods, a YouTube show about modifying cars
 Roman numeral for 1900
 Montreal Citizens' Movement, a municipal political party in Montreal, Quebec, Canada